Naif is a locality in Deira side of Dubai, United Arab Emirates.

Naif may also refer to:

People

Given name 
 Naif Hazazi (born 1989), Saudi Arabian footballer
 Naif Mohammed Jasim, Iraqi politician
 Naif Al-Qadi (born 1979), Saudi Arabian footballer
 Prince Naif, or Nayef bin Abdul-Aziz Al Saud (1934–2012), the former Crown prince of Saudi Arabia
 Naif bin Abdullah (1914–1983), the youngest son of King Abdullah of Jordan
 Naif Abu-Sharah  (1966–2004), the local commander of Fatah's al-Aqsa Martyrs' Brigades in Nablus
 Naif Hawatmeh, or Nayef Hawatmeh (born 1938), a Jordanian politician

Surname 
 Alejandro Naif (born 1973), Palestinian footballer
 Abd ar-Razzaq an-Naif (1933–1978), Iraqi politician
 Hareth Al Naif  (born 1993), a Syrian footballer
 Muhammad ibn Naif, or Muhammad bin Nayef (born 1959), the Minister of Interior of Saudi Arabia

Fictional characters 
 Naif al-Sheikh, a spy and superhero in the DC Universe

Other uses 
 Naif (band), an Indonesian band
 Naif, a person who is naive; see naivety
 Navigation and Ancillary Information Facility, a part of NASA that developed the Spacecraft Planet Instrument C-matrix Events (SPICE)
 Norwegian Federation of American Sports

Arabic-language surnames
Arabic masculine given names